Sir Eldon Wylie Griffiths (25 May 1925 – 3 June 2014) was a British Conservative politician and journalist.

Early life
Griffiths was born on 25 May 1925 in Wigan, Lancashire. His Welsh father was a police sergeant. He attended Ashton Grammar School. Following the Second World War service in the Royal Air Force he gained a double first class degree in history from Emmanuel College, Cambridge and an MA from Yale University.

Career

Journalism
After university Griffiths worked in the Conservative Research Department and became a journalist and farmer. He was managing editor of Newsweek.

Political career
He became the MP for Bury St Edmunds after a by-election in 1964, and represented the seat until he retired in 1992. His Telegraph obituary claimed he was "rangy, articulate, but dour, (Griffiths was) a political loner, and not over-popular on the Tory benches" However it listed many achievements as MP and in other spheres. He served as Minister for Sport during the Edward Heath government of 1970 to 1974. He also served as parliamentary spokesman for the Police Federation. In 1985, he was made a Knight Bachelor for "political service".

Academia
For a brief period while an MP, Griffiths worked as a professor at the University of California, a role in which The Times said led to him being called the member for Orange County.

Director appointments
Griffiths was a director of one of Gerald Carroll's Carroll Group companies.

Personal life
In June 2013, aged 88, he announced his third marriage, to Susan Donnell.

Honours
He was a Freeman of the borough of St Edmundsbury.

References

The Times Guide to the House of Commons, Times Newspapers Ltd, 1966 & 1987

External links 
 

1925 births
2014 deaths
People educated at Ashton-under-Lyne Grammar School
Alumni of Emmanuel College, Cambridge
Yale University alumni
Conservative Party (UK) MPs for English constituencies
Government ministers of the United Kingdom
Knights Bachelor
UK MPs 1959–1964
UK MPs 1964–1966
UK MPs 1966–1970
UK MPs 1970–1974
UK MPs 1974
UK MPs 1974–1979
UK MPs 1979–1983
UK MPs 1983–1987
UK MPs 1987–1992
Royal Air Force personnel of World War II
Politicians awarded knighthoods